Lucien Pissarro (20 February 1863 – 10 July 1944) was a French landscape painter, printmaker, wood engraver, designer, and printer of fine books. His landscape paintings employ techniques of Impressionism and Neo-Impressionism, but he also exhibited with Les XX. Apart from his landscapes, he painted a few still lifes and family portraits. Until 1890 he worked in France, but thereafter was based in Great Britain. He was the oldest son of the French Impressionist painter Camille Pissarro and his wife Julie (née Vellay).

Biography
Pissarro was born on 20 February 1863 in Paris, French Third Republic. He was the oldest of seven children; the son of French Impressionist painter Camille Pissarro and his wife Julie (née Vellay). He studied with his father and—like his siblings Georges and Félix—he spent his formative years surrounded by his father's fellow artists, such as Claude Monet and Pierre-Auguste Renoir, who frequented the Pissarro home. He was influenced by Georges Seurat and Paul Signac.

He first visited Great Britain in 1870–71, during the Franco-Prussian War. He returned in 1883–84, and in 1890 settled permanently in London. In 1886, he exhibited at the last of the Impressionist exhibitions. From 1886 to 1894 he exhibited with the Salon des Independents. On 10 August 1892 he married Esther Levi Bensusan in Richmond. While renting a cottage at Epping, Essex on 8 October 1893 their daughter and only child, Orovida Camille Pissarro, was born. Orovida also became an artist. He met Charles Ricketts and Charles Shannon, and contributed woodcuts to their Dial. In 1894 he founded the Eragny Press and with his wife and illustrated and printed books until the press was closed in 1914. In 1897 the family moved to 62 Bath Road in Stamford Brook, Chiswick. In 1903 he designed the typeface Brook Type.

Pissarro associated with Walter Sickert in Fitzroy Street, and in 1906 became a member of the New English Art Club. From 1913 to 1919 he painted landscapes of Dorset, Westmorland, Devon, Essex, Surrey and Sussex.

In 1916 Pissarro became a British citizen. While in Britain he was one of the founders of the Camden Town Group of artists. In 1919, he formed the Monarro Group with J.B. Manson as the London Secretary and Théo van Rysselberghe as the Paris secretary, aiming to show artists inspired by Impressionist painters, Claude Monet and Camille Pissarro. The group ceased three years later.

From 1922 to 1937 he painted regularly in the south of France, interspersed with painting expeditions to Derbyshire, south Wales and Essex. From 1934 to 1944 he exhibited at the Royal Academy in London. He died on 10 July 1944, in Hewood, Dorset.

References

Further reading
 Arts Council, Lucien Pissarro 1863–1944 a centenary exhibition (1963)
 Bensusan-Butt, J. Recollections of Lucien Pissarro in his seventies (1977)
 Bidwell, J. MacGregor, M. (eds), Pastorale, wood engravings by Lucien Pissarro, (2011. Whittington Press)
 Canterbury City Council Museums, Lucien Pissarro his influence on English art 1890–1914 (1986)
 Fine Art Society, Drawings, watercolours, oil paintings, woodcuts and etchings by Lucien Pissarro 1863–1944 (2003)
 Genz, M. D. A History of the Eragny Press 1894–1914 (2004)
 Jenkins, D. F. and Bonett, H. Lucien Pissarro 1863–1944, February 2011, in Helena Bonett, Ysanne Holt, Jennifer Mundy (eds.), The Camden Town Group in Context, Tate (2012)
 Meadmore, W. S. Lucien Pissarro un coeur simple (1962)
 Pissarro, C. Camille Pissarro, Lettres à son fils Lucien, ed. J. Rewald (Editions Albin Michel, Paris 1950) [English translation: 'Camille Pissarro, Letters to his son Lucien']
 Pissarro, C. Correspondance de Camille Pissarro, ed. J. Bailly-Herzberg (5 vols., Presses Universitaires de France, Paris, 1980 & Editions du Valhermeil, Paris, 1986–1991)   –  –  –  – 
 Pissarro, L. The letters of Lucien to Camille Pissarro 1883–1903, ed. A. Thorold (Cambridge University Press, Cambridge, New York & Oakleigh, 1993)   
 Reed, N. Pissarro in West London (Lilburne Press 1997) 
 Reed, N. Pissarro in Essex (Lilburne Press 1992) 
 Thorold, A. A Catalogue of the oil paintings of Lucien Pissarro (1983)
 Urbanelli, L. The wood engravings of Lucien Pissarro ... (1994)
 Whiteley, J. (ed). Ashmolean Museum, Lucien Pissarro in England: the Eragny Press 1895–1914, (2011)

External links
 
 An artwork by Lucien Pissarro at the Ben Uri site
 
 
 Works
 Signac, 1863–1935, a fully digitized exhibition catalog from The Metropolitan Museum of Art Libraries, which contains material on Pissarro (see index)

1863 births
1944 deaths
19th-century British male artists
19th-century British printmakers
19th-century French engravers
19th-century French male artists
19th-century French painters
19th-century French Sephardi Jews
20th-century British Sephardi Jews
20th-century British male artists
20th-century British painters
20th-century British printmakers
20th-century French engravers
20th-century French male artists
20th-century French painters
20th-century French Sephardi Jews
British male painters
British wood engravers
Engravers from Paris
French emigrants to England
French expatriates in the Kingdom of Great Britain
French Impressionist painters
French male painters
French people of Portuguese-Jewish descent
French printmakers
French wood engravers
Jewish painters
Painters from Paris
Lucien
Post-impressionist painters
Sibling artists